The 2017 FIBA Africa Women's Clubs Champions Cup (23rd edition), was an international basketball tournament that took place at the Pavilhão Multiusos do Kilamba, in Luanda, Angola, from November 11 to 19, 2017. The tournament, organized by FIBA Africa and hosted by Grupo Desportivo Interclube, was contested by 9 teams split into 2 groups, the first four of each group qualifying for the knock-out stage (quarter, semis and final).
 
The tournament was won by Primeiro de Agosto from Angola.

Draw

Squads

Preliminary rounds

Times given below are in local WAT (UTC+1).

Group A

Group B

Knockout stage
Championship bracket

5-8th bracket

Quarter finals

5th-8th place

Semifinals

7th place

5th place

Bronze medal game

Gold medal game

Final standings

Statistical Leaders

Individual Tournament Highs

Points

Rebounds

Assists

Steals

Blocks

Turnovers

2-point field goal percentage

3-point field goal percentage

Free throw percentage

Individual Game Highs

Team Tournament Highs

Points

Rebounds

Assists

Steals

Blocks

Turnovers

2-point field goal percentage

3-point field goal percentage

Free throw percentage

Team Game highs

All Tournament Team

See also
 2017 FIBA Africa Championship for Women

References

External links 
 Official Website
 

2017 FIBA Africa Women's Clubs Champions Cup
Women's Clubs Champions Cup
Africa Women's Clubs Champions Cup
FIBA